Khadzhibey Estuary, or Khadzhibeyskyi Liman, is an estuary of the north-western part of the Black Sea, located on the north-west from the City of Odessa. It is named after the former Khadzhibey fortress.  

The estuary is separated from the sea by the sandbar, which has about 5 km length. The length of the estuary is 31 km, width 0.5–2.5 km, square 70 km2, depth up to 2.5 m. The bottom of the estuary is covered by the flakes of black mud, which have healthy properties. The river Malyi Kuyalnyk flows to the estuary. The fauna of the estuary consists of crabs Rhithropanopeus harrisii, shrimps Palaemon elegans, round goby Neogobius melanostomus and monkey goby Neogobius fluviatilis, etc.

References
 Starushenko L.I., Bushuyev S.G. (2001) Prichernomorskiye limany Odeschiny i ih rybohoziaystvennoye znacheniye. Astroprint, Odessa, 151 pp. (in Russian)
 North-western Black Sea: biology and ecology, Eds.: Y.P. Zaitsev, B.G. Aleksandrov, G.G. Minicheva, Naukova Dumka, Kiev, 2006, 701 pp.

See also
 Berezan Estuary
 Dniester Estuary
 Small Adzhalyk Estuary
 Tylihul Estuary
 Sukhyi Estuary

Estuaries of the Black Sea
Estuaries of Ukraine
Balneotherapy
Landforms of Odesa Oblast